Rockin' the Rhein with the Grateful Dead is a Grateful Dead triple live album released in 2004. It was recorded April 24, 1972, at "Rheinhallen" (Halle Sechs der Messe Düsseldorf), in the German town of Düsseldorf, during the band's European tour of 1972. The complete concert is included, but the order of the tracks on the CD was altered to fit the show on three discs, while preserving groups of segued tracks.

The two bonus tracks, "Turn On Your Lovelight" and "The Stranger (Two Souls in Communion)", were recorded May 24, 1972, in London, England. Additional tracks from this date had been previously released on Steppin' Out with the Grateful Dead. Pre-orders through the Grateful Dead Store included a bonus disc, recorded during the band's seven-day run at the Academy of Music in New York City, the last American shows before the European tour. More from this run was released on Dick's Picks Volume 30 and Dave's Picks Volume 14.

The April 24, 1972 show was later released with the entire tour, and the song order intact, on four discs as part of Europe '72: The Complete Recordings, along with the London tracks.

Track listing

Disc one
First set:
"Truckin'" (Garcia, Hunter, Lesh, Weir) – 11:04
"Tennessee Jed" (Garcia, Hunter) – 8:07
"Chinatown Shuffle" (Ron "Pigpen" McKernan) – 3:06
"Black-Throated Wind" (Barlow, Weir) – 6:51
"China Cat Sunflower" > (Garcia, Hunter) – 6:06
"I Know You Rider" (traditional) – 6:19
"Mr. Charlie" (Hunter, McKernan) – 4:16
"Beat It on Down the Line" (Fuller) – 3:21
"Loser" (Garcia, Hunter) – 7:34
"Playing in the Band" (Mickey Hart, Weir, Hunter) – 11:23
"Next Time You See Me" (Forest, Harvey) – 4:37
"Me and Bobby McGee" (Foster, Kristofferson) – 6:10

Disc two
First set, continued:
"Good Lovin'" (Clark, Resnick) – 18:39
"Casey Jones" (Garcia, Hunter) – 6:15
Third set: 
"He's Gone" (Garcia, Hunter) – 10:31
"Hurts Me Too" (James, Sehorn) – 8:36
"El Paso" (Robbins) – 4:44
Bonus tracks – May 24 – Lyceum Theatre, London, England:
"Turn on Your Love Light" > (Malone, Scott) – 12:04 
"The Stranger (Two Souls in Communion)" (McKernan) – 8:23

Disc three
Second set: 
"Dark Star" > (Grateful Dead, Hunter) – 25:46
"Me & My Uncle" > (Phillips) – 3:22
"Dark Star" > (Grateful Dead, Hunter) – 14:53
"Wharf Rat" > (Garcia, Hunter) – 8:58
"Sugar Magnolia" (Hunter, Weir) – 8:03
Third set, continued: 
"Not Fade Away" > (Holly, Petty) – 3:17
"Goin' Down the Road Feeling Bad" > (traditional) – 6:31
"Not Fade Away" (Holly, Petty) – 3:01
Encore:
"One More Saturday Night" (Weir) – 4:49

Notes

Bonus Disc 
"Academy of Music, New York City March 1972"
"Playing in the Band" (Weir, Hart, Hunter) - 10:00
"Sugar Magnolia" > (Weir, Hunter) - 7:45
"Caution (Do Not Stop on Tracks)" > (Grateful Dead) - 19:02
"Jam" > (Grateful Dead) - 6:20
"Uncle John's Band" (Garcia, Hunter) - 7:55
"Dark Star" (Garcia, Hart, Kreutzmann, McKernan, Lesh, Weir, Hunter) - 22:39
Tracks 1 & 6, March 23, 1972
Tracks 2 - 5, March 22, 1972

Personnel
Grateful Dead:
Jerry Garcia – guitar, vocals
Bob Weir – guitar (rhythm), vocals
Phil Lesh – bass, vocals
Ron "Pigpen" McKernan – organ, harmonica, percussion, vocals
Bill Kreutzmann	– drums
Donna Jean Godchaux – vocals
Keith Godchaux – piano

Production
Betty Cantor-Jackson – recording
Bob Matthews – recording
Jim Furman – recording
Dennis Leonard – recording
Jeffrey Norman – mixing
David Lemieux – tape archivist
Eileen Law/Grateful Dead Archives – archival research
Richard Biffle – cover art
Mary Ann Mayer – photographs
Grateful Dead Archives – photographs
Brian Connors – art coordination
Robert Minkin – package layout and production
 Wizard – doodles [Inside the CD package are pictures of the actual tape reels with drawings on the protective covers]

Charts
Album - Billboard

References 

Grateful Dead live albums
2004 live albums
Rhino Records live albums